The 1965 Cork Senior Hurling Championship was the 77th staging of the Cork Senior Hurling Championship since its establishment by the Cork County Board in 1887. The draw for the opening round fixtures took place at the County Convention on 31 January 1965. The championship began on 11 April 1965 and ended on 31 October 1965.

Glen Rovers were the defending champions, however, they were defeated by St. Finbarr's in the second round.

On 31 October 1965, St. Finbarr's won the championship following a 6–8 to 2–6 defeat of University College Cork in the final. This was their 16th championship title overall and their first in ten championship seasons.

Charlie McCarthy from the St. Finbarr's club was the championship's top scorer with 4–14.

Team changes

To Championship

Promoted from the Cork Intermediate Hurling Championship
 Castletownroche

Results

First round

Second round

Quarter-finals

Semi-finals

Final

Championship statistics

Top scorers

Top scorer overall

Top scorers in a single game

Miscellaneous

 St. Finbarr's win the title for the first time since 1955.

References

Cork Senior Hurling Championship
Cork Senior Hurling Championship